CPHPC ((R)-1-{6-[(R)-2-carboxypyrrolidin-1-yl]-6-oxohexanoyl}pyrrolidine-2-carboxylic acid) is a proline-derived small molecule able to strip amyloid P (AP) from deposits by reducing levels of circulating serum amyloid P (SAP). The SAP-amyloid association has also been identified as a possible drug target for anti-amyloid therapy, with the recent development and first stage clinical trials of CPHPC for amyloidosis.

CPHPC has also been patented for possible treatment of Alzheimer's disease.

Mechanism
The symmetrical nature of CPHPC allows it to bind to two molecules of AP (the SAP subunits). This allows five molecules of CPHPC to bind two SAP pentamers together by the B/binding face blocking the binding on to existing amyloid deposits.

References

Pyrrolidines
Amino acid derivatives